G. Suresh Kumar is an Indian film producer and actor known for Poochakkorumookuthi and Araam Thamburan. He produces films under the banner Revathy Kalamandhir an Indian film production company based in Thiruvananthapuram which is founded in 1993 by him and he produced more than 32 Malayalam films under this banner.

Early and personal life
He completed his Bachelors in Commerce from Kerala University in Trivandrum. He married Menaka Suresh, an Indian actress who appeared in more than 125 films. They have two daughters named Keerthy Suresh, who is also an actress and honored with a National Awards in 2019 for the best actress, and Revathy Suresh who is an associate director to Priyadarsan.

Career 
Kumar started his career in film as an assistant director with the Malayalam feature film named Thiranottam in 1978. By 1982, he started producing feature films under the banner Sooryodaya Creations. Then he produced about 32 Malayalam-language films under his current banner Revathy Kalaamandhir. Besides producing films, Suresh started his career in acting in 2015 and as of the year 2021 he appeared in 21 films as an actor. He is the President of Kerala Film Chamber of Commerce. He made an embarking role in the film Marakkar: Lion of the Arabian Sea as Kochi Raja.

Filmography

As producer

As actor

References

External links 

1959 births
Living people
Indian film producers